Giorgos Skalenakis (17 May 1926 – 14 September 2014) was a Greek film director and actor.

Selected filmography 
 Dancing the Sirtaki (1966)
 Queen of Clubs (1966)
 Oh! That Wife of Mine (1967)
 Imperiale (1968)
 Apollo Goes on Holiday (1968)

References

External links 
 

1926 births
2014 deaths
Greek film directors
Greek male film actors
People from Port Said